James Witt Sewell (1865–1955) was a writer and teacher of the English language at the Hume-Fogg High School in Nashville, Tennessee.

Bibliography
 An English Grammar with W. M. Baskervill, in 1896
 Elements of English Grammar with W. M. Baskervill, in 1900
 A School Grammar of the English Language with W. M. Baskervill, in 1903 
 Language lessons (Baskervill-Sewell English course), in 1903 
 A School Grammar of the English language. Rev. ed (Baskervill-Sewell English course), in 1909 
 Practical English for seventh and eighth grades, in 1911 
 Makers of America, in 1930
 Team work, in 1930

External links
 
 
 

1865 births
1955 deaths
American non-fiction writers
American academics of English literature